Kilian Joel Elkinson (born 2 April 1990; nicknamed Killa) is a Bermudian footballer who is a midfielder. 
He played for the University of Toronto, and was OUA East Division MVP and CIS First Team All Canadian. He has played professionally for Toronto FC, the North Toronto Nitros, and Robin Hood F.C. 
He has played for the Bermuda National Team, including in the 2018 FIFA World Cup qualifying and in Caribbean Cup games. He played for Canada at the 2015 Summer Universiade. He played for Team Canada in the 2009 Maccabiah Games in Israel, 2013 Maccabiah Games (winning a bronze medal), and 2017 Maccabiah Games.

Early life 
Born in Hamilton, Bermuda, Elkinson played for the youth teams of PHC Zebras and North Village Rams in Bermuda, before moving to Toronto at the age of 15. He is 5' 7". Elkinson is Jewish, which qualified him to play in the Maccabiah Games in Israel.

Later life 
In Canada, he attended Upper Canada College in Toronto, with whom he won three Conference of Independent Schools of Ontario Athletic Association championships, including one with the 2008 squad which he captained.

Club career
A left-footed player and midfielder, he was signed to a developmental spot on the roster of Toronto FC in Major League Soccer. He appeared in the MLS Reserve League and friendlies.

He played for the University of Toronto. In 2014 he was OUA East Division MVP, and leading goalscorer of the Ontario League with 11 goals (4th in the OUA) in 10 games, and was named a CIS First Team All Canadian.

In 2016, he played for North Toronto Nitros in League1 Ontario, finishing fourth in league scoring and being named an All-Star with 15 goals in just 13 appearances.

From 2016 to 2020 he played for Robin Hood F.C. in Bermuda.

In 2019 he played for Sydney University (Sydney Uni SFC) in Australia.

International career

For Bermuda
Elkinson became eligible for the Bermuda National Team, and received his first international cap in June 2015 in a friendly against Puerto Rico. He then made the squad to face Guatemala in 2018 FIFA World Cup qualifying. He played in Caribbean Cup games, and was most recently involved in the CONCACAF Nations League League A match against Mexico in Toluca.

For Canada
Elkinson also represents Canada. He played for Canada in the 2015 Summer Universiade.

He played for Team Canada in the 2009 Maccabiah Games in Israel, 2013 Maccabiah Games (winning a bronze medal), and 2017 Maccabiah Games squads for football.

Honours

Country 

 Maccabi Canada
 Maccabiah Bronze Medal: 2013

Legal career
In 2019, he was a member of a group of University of Sydney students who ranked equal first among Australian universities at the 26th Willem C Vis International Commercial Arbitration Moot Competition.

References

External links 
 
 
 
 Varsity Blues Profile

1990 births
Living people
Association football defenders
Association football forwards
Bermudian emigrants to Canada
Bermuda international footballers
Bermudian expatriate footballers
Bermudian footballers
Bermudian people of Jewish descent
Competitors at the 2015 Summer Universiade
Jewish footballers
League1 Ontario players
Maccabiah Games bronze medalists for Canada
Maccabiah Games medalists in football
Competitors at the 2009 Maccabiah Games
Competitors at the 2013 Maccabiah Games
Competitors at the 2017 Maccabiah Games
People from Hamilton, Bermuda
Robin Hood F.C. players
Sydney Law School alumni
Toronto FC players
Toronto Varsity Blues soccer players
Upper Canada College alumni
21st-century Bermudian lawyers